Ruby Yap (叶俞均; born 28 December 1991) is a Malaysian-born Chinese feature film, drama series, theatre drama and radio drama all-round actress and singer. Ruby made a successful transition to theatre drama stage performance, winning a "Best Actress in a Leading Role" award in 2016 in the 13th Malaysia Asli Drama Awards (ADA). She won it for her role in the critically acclaimed Soviet war drama "The Dawns Here Are Quiet" based on Boris Vasilyev's novel of the same name.

She achieved international recognition when she portrayed Cindy, a lawyer assistant who stands up for justice in the independent Hong Kong film Million Loves in Me, receiving a "Award of Merit for Supporting Actress" in The IndieFest Film Award 2017 at San Diego, California and "Award of Excellence for Supporting Actress" in Depth of Field International Film Festival 2017 in Delaware, USA. Ruby garnered further recognition for her "Best Supporting Actress" award in the Hollywood International Moving Pictures Film Festival (HIMPFF) in 2017 and "The Best Supporting Actress" in the 2019 North Europe International Film Festival. In 2017, Ruby Faye released her first single Who Am I, and produced a musical theater "90's" as a warm-up promo for her upcoming debut EP mini-album.

Acting career
Ruby was the youngest nominee of Best Actress for her first short film The Wither of Sprout in BMW Shorties 2011. Belonging to Malaysia's new generation of artists, she was invited to join the domestic Chinese drama industry, where she further broadened her artistic skills by trying her hand at acting. She played in The Undercover alongside Malaysia TV channel NTV7 top 10 artist Adrian Tan, and later caught viewers' attention during her debut drama serial, playing the role of a teens prostitute and a young killer in Pianissimo.

Ruby was nominated as one of the top 5 in the Best Newcomer category in NTV7 Golden Awards 2014 in which will be held at Putrajaya International convention Centre on 20 September 2014.

Besides, she has selected as one of the supporting cast by the winner of 30th Hong Kong Film Awards Best Actor Nick Cheung in his directorial debut film "The Hungry Ghost Ritual", released in the year 2014. In 2014, Ruby became the 2nd lead actress in NTV7 Chinese drama "The Scavenger". In 2015, Ruby is invited by Hong Kong film director Clifton Ko as special appearance guest actress for his directed musical theatre "Shooting Star" in Malaysia. In the same year, Ruby is selected by Beijing-based theatre director Dr. Deric Gan to take part in his theatre production with Russia well-known novel The Dawns Here Are Quiet. Ruby is the main cast and she was playing a tragic figure, the complicated beautiful soldier Zhenya Komelkowa.

Ruby has worked with some famous and talented directors and artiste, they are Clifton Ko Chi-Sum (Hong Kong), Nick Cheung Ka-Fai (Hong Kong), Chiu Keng Guan (Malaysia), Ho Yu Hang (Malaysia), Xie Xiaodong (China), Zahir Omar (Malaysia), Dr. Deric Gan (Malaysia), Patrick Yau Tat-Chi (Hong Kong), Sam Loh (Singapore), Sampson Yuen (Hong Kong), Chan Wai Cheong (Malaysia), Edmund Yeo (Malaysia) etc.

Ruby has worked with some famous and talented actors and actresses, they are Nick Cheung Ka-Fai (Hong Kong), Simon Yam (Hong Kong), Annie Liu (Taiwan), Huang CaiLun (China), Lo Koon Lan (Hong Kong), Wu Bai (Taiwan), Kaiser Chuang (Taiwan), Shiou Chieh Kai (Taiwan), Landy Wen (Taiwan), Mimi Chu (Hong Kong), Jordan Voon (Malaysia) etc.

Environmental advocate
Ruby was named a Program Artiste Ambassador for JCI Entrepreneur Malaysia in February 2015 with a special focus of promoting green revival- save the earth.

She was also selected by Magnum & Mega Ultimate for Green Revival 2016 in Malaysia.

Filmography

Film

Television Series

Web Drama

Theatre

Short Film
2011: The Wither of Sprout 
2012: Love Lane
2017: Departure . A Sunny Day 出發·在晴朗的一天 (<Light & Shadow·Macau> Micro Film Creative Competition Champion)

TV Host
 2012: Fun Journey 東南西北三人行
 2015: You Can't Guess Me 估我唔到
 2016: JOOX Music Walker

TVC
 2014: b.liv absolute matte 
 2017: CellLabs Classaanta CNY online adv 
 2017: YES Academy online short film 
 2017: RT Pastry House commercial short Adv 
 2017: Panasonic Malaysia Sky Series Info TVC 
 2020: DAIKIN Malaysia CNY short film（The Twins）

Music

Music album
Ruby's first album of the same name is a collection of three songs selected from the musical [90], "Who Am I", "90G", "Dream" and a new original song called "Gone", a mini album organized into a rich piece of music. Ruby Faye album is produced by Hanz Kuok, a famous young singer and composer in Malaysia, and Asia famous composer Percy Phang is the consulting music producer. The album was official released on 6 June 2018.

Single
 2018: Story Teller - Ruby Faye 
 2018: Dream - Ruby Faye 
 2018: Gone - Ruby Faye 
 2017: 90G - Ruby Faye 
 2017: Who AM I - Ruby Faye

Featuring (EP)
 2015: Hi Bye - Fayse Goh feat. Ruby Yap

Others

Emcee
 2015: MCC Korea Brand Cosmetic & Beauty 1st Flagship Grand Opening
 2016: 13th ADA Drama Award 
 2017: I have a date with teacher Annual Dinner by SRJK (C) Kepong 1 & Kepong 2
 2017: Jyn Chiu's Music Album Media Conference

Music - Singing Performance
 2012: Miss International Model Yacht Malaysia 
 2013: Malaysia Chinese Qi Pao Beauty Pageant 
 2013: MY ASTRO全民迎新Ulala
 2014: Loud Speaker 6th Flagship Grand Opening 
 2015: Zero Limits x Merdeka Madness Music Festival Penang 
 2015: Joey Leong 21st Birthday Mini-Concert
 2017: Asia Muse Girl Search Grand Final 
 2017: 30-Hour Famine DIY Camp - First City UC (23/7)
 2017: 30-Hour Famine DIY Camp - Taylor Lakeside University (29/7)
 2017: 30-Hour Famine DIY Camp - Help National University (29/7)
 2017: 30-Hour Famine World Vision Malaysia - (30/7)
 2018: ASTRO Chinese New Year Whoopee Countdown Show - 迎春接福大慶典 (15/2)
 2018: Face of Asia-Pacific (13/4) 
 2018: Sing!China – Malaysia Final- Star Challenge Team (19/5)
 2018: 30-Hour Famine DIY Camp - SJKC Chin Kwang Wahyu (9/6)
 2018: The Ultimate Jazz by Calmeraft. Ruby (21/7) 
 2018: Influencers Festival (22/9)
 2018: Tremella Global Product Launch Annual Nite (14/11)

Judge
 2015： Mega Ultimate K’Storm KPOP Dance Cover Competition Grand Final

Awards/Achievement

Drama

Music

Business

Fashion

Audience Choice

References

External links

 
 
 
 Ruby Faye Youtube
 狄妃转捩点“请不要标签90后！”| 娱乐| 星洲网Sin Chew Daily - 星洲日报
 倾听90后的心声- 生活志| 星洲网Sin Chew Daily - 星洲日报
 90要怎么Young?- 生活志| 星洲网Sin Chew Daily - 星洲日报
 【艺想世界】用戏剧消灭世代隔阂的90后 - Ruby 狄妃| CityPlus FM 環球直通
 9零！PLAY女孩敢梦敢想狄妃盼开演唱会| Juksy Malaysia
 誠意十足新人90後PLAY 女孩RUBY 狄妃挑戰發單曲＋音樂舞台劇| Almond Magazine
 大马新人Ruby狄妃：“90后的我们没有你想象中的负面！”| 佳禮網
 大马新人Ruby狄妃曾当温岚替身！推出单曲《WHO AM I》| 佳禮網
 9零PLAY女孩Ruby狄妃推出单曲《WHO AM I》闯乐坛!| Woah.MY
 八八六十事：本月推荐星：Ruby狄妃 Part1
 八八六十事：本月推荐星：Ruby狄妃 Part2
 9零PLAY女孩Ruby狄妃推出单曲《WHO AM I》闯乐坛挑战30天音乐概念舞台剧| MY FM
 狄妃Ruby Yap.靓丽职场美女|风采Feminine
 時尚拍攝- 南洋商報 
 狄妃-大馬高雄箱子相遇記|東方日報

1991 births
Living people
Malaysian film actresses
Malaysian people of Chinese descent
21st-century Malaysian women singers
People from Kuala Lumpur
21st-century Malaysian actresses